Miguel Ângelo da Silva Rocha (born 10 November 1994), known as Xeka, is a Portuguese professional footballer who plays as a midfielder for Ligue 1 club Rennes.

Formed at Braga, he spent most of his career in France, playing for Lille, Dijon and Rennes in Ligue 1 and winning the league with the first of those teams in 2020–21 while making 145 total appearances.

Club career

Braga
Born in Rebordosa, Paredes, Xeka received his nickname from his grandfather for being the youngest of his siblings, just like him. He played youth football with three clubs, including Valencia CF from Spain until the age of 17. Having returned to his homeland, he started playing as a senior with S.C. Braga's reserves in the Segunda Liga, being then loaned for two years to S.C. Covilhã of the same league. On 23 September 2013, whilst at the service of the former side, he scored his first goal in competition, but in a 1–3 home loss against S.L. Benfica B.

Xeka started being called to Braga's first team in October 2016, by manager José Peseiro. He made his debut in the Primeira Liga late in that month, featuring the full 90 minutes in a 1–0 home win over G.D. Chaves. His fortunes changed, however, when Jorge Simão became the new coach before the end of the year.

Lille
On 31 January 2017, Xeka was loaned to Lille OSC from Ligue 1 until June. He made his debut four days later as a starter in a 1–0 home loss to FC Lorient. He made 13 appearances for the 12th-place team and scored in a 3–0 win at Montpellier HSC on 29 April, assisted by compatriot Rony Lopes.

In June 2017, Lille exercised the €5 million buyout clause to make Xeka's move permanent. In the last hours of the summer transfer window, he joined Dijon FCO in the same league in a season-long loan. He became a regular under Christophe Galtier at the Stade Pierre-Mauroy the following year, but suffered a thigh injury in a 5–1 home victory over Paris Saint-Germain F.C. on 14 April 2019, ruling him out until September.

Xeka contributed 33 matches and one goal during the 2020–21 campaign to help Lille win the national championship for the fourth time in their history. On 1 August 2021, he scored in the 1–0 defeat of PSG in the Trophée des Champions, with the club winning that trophy for the first time ever.

On 20 May 2022, Xeka was released at the end of his contract.

Rennes
On 21 September 2022, Xeka agreed to a two-year deal at Stade Rennais F.C. also of the French top tier. He made his debut on 9 October, starting in a 3–0 home win over Derby Breton rivals FC Nantes.

Honours
Lille
Ligue 1: 2020–21
Trophée des Champions: 2021

References

External links

Portuguese League profile 

1994 births
Living people
People from Paredes, Portugal
Sportspeople from Porto District
Portuguese footballers
Association football midfielders
Primeira Liga players
Liga Portugal 2 players
F.C. Paços de Ferreira players
S.C. Braga B players
S.C. Covilhã players
S.C. Braga players
Ligue 1 players
Championnat National 2 players
Lille OSC players
Dijon FCO players
Stade Rennais F.C. players
Portugal youth international footballers
Portuguese expatriate footballers
Expatriate footballers in Spain
Expatriate footballers in France
Portuguese expatriate sportspeople in Spain
Portuguese expatriate sportspeople in France